Pia de Quint (born 26 April 1988) is a Belgian professional racing cyclist who rides for Lares–Waowdeals.

See also
 List of 2016 UCI Women's Teams and riders

References

External links
 

1988 births
Living people
Belgian female cyclists
Place of birth missing (living people)